Lino Guanciale (born 21 May 1979 in Avezzano) is an Italian actor.

Early life 
Born in Abruzzo, his father is a doctor and his mother is a teacher; he has a brother whose name is Giorgio. He graduated from Liceo Scientifico, and then he attended the Faculty of Humanities at the Sapienza University of Rome.

He played rugby for some time. He attended Accademia Nazionale di Arte Drammatica Silvio D'Amico and graduated in 2003, there he also obtained the Gassman Prize.

Career 
His career starts with theatre: acting in Romeo e Giulietta directed by Gigi Proietti. Then he worked with Franco Branciaroli, Luca Ronconi, Walter Le Moli, Massimo Popolizio, Claudio Longhi and Michele Placido.

Since 2005 he works as teacher and as scientific and theatrical popularizer at University and high school.

Credits

Films

Television

References

External links 

1979 births
Living people
21st-century Italian male actors
People from Avezzano
People of Abruzzese descent